The Irisbus Cristalis is a trolleybus manufactured by Iveco Bus (formerly known as Irisbus. It comes in two variants:
ETB12 – Rigid bus
ETB18 – Articulated bus

The ETB12 is a full-sized trolleybus whose competitors were the MAZ-ETON T203, Škoda 24Tr Irisbus and the Škoda 30Tr SOR.

Irisbus vehicles
Trolleybuses
Low-entry buses
Articulated buses